Re:Creators (stylized as Re:CREATORS) is a Japanese anime television series produced by Troyca. The series is about a high school student who becomes involved in a battle between several characters from manga, anime, and video games who somehow appear in the real world. It aired from April to September 2017, and was exclusively streamed by Amazon on their Amazon Video service. A manga adaptation by Daiki Kase was serialized in Shogakukan's Monthly Sunday Gene-X from April 2017 to November 2019.

Plot
Sōta Mizushino is a young high school student and anime fan who dreams of writing his own light novel. While watching the anime adaptation of the mecha light novel Elemental Symphony of Vogelchevalier to look for inspiration, the tablet computer he is watching it on sputters and drags him into the anime's world, where he witnesses a battle between the anime's character Selesia and a mysterious girl wearing a military uniform. After returning with Selesia, Sōta discovers that other characters from different stories and forms of media were also brought to the real world, with some of them aligned with the military uniform princess, who promised them the ways to end the strife in their worlds and a way back home, unaware of her true intentions. To stop her, Sōta and Selesia agree to find the other characters and bring them home; lest the military uniform princess will bring untold destruction to every world that exists.

Characters

Main

A 16-year old high school student who likes to draw, but suffers from artist's block. He was once friends with Altair's creator, Setsuna. However, he grew jealous of her because of how everyone liked her drawings while his mostly went ignored. As a result of this, he brushed her off when she was accused of plagiarism. However, after learning that she committed suicide, he was left traumatized with self-loathing. As a result, upon learning Altair's true identity, he initially kept this a secret from the others, unable to face his demons. However, he eventually pulls through and resolves to stop Altair to atone for his actions.

A mysterious young girl initially known as the  who brought the other creations into the real world. While she claimed to do this to force their creators to alter their worlds, she actually aims to destroy the real world out of spite over the death of her own creator. It is eventually revealed that she originated from the music video Altair: World Étude. Being a creation without a story, she is able to adopt powers from fan-fictions about her; she calls this ability "Holopsicon". However, overusing these abilities will cause her to fade from the real world, though she can bypass this by getting her viewers' approval.

The main female protagonist of the anime . She is a princess and a knight who, alongside her partner Charon, fights the series' antagonists. She uses a sword and is capable of flight. She also owns a mecha called Vogelchevalier and later temporarily gained the ability to use fire magic. Upon arriving in the real world, she initially struggled to cope with the revelation that she is a creation, but quickly came to terms with it. She retains her strong morals and drive in the real world, striving to stop Altair and protect the creators.

, Sayaka Ohara (delusion; ep. 13)
An NPC from the open world RPG . Though stoic, Meteora is a strong-willed tactician that works to protect the creators, as she believes her game was created well. Meteora normally fights with her tome, but her true strength is in tactics and planning. Upon arriving in the real world, she becomes the tactical leader of Sōta's group.

Creations
 are fictional characters that are taken out from various forms of 2D entertainment such as anime, manga, light novels, and video games by the "Military Uniform Princess". Much like in their respective worlds, they are able to use their own powers, making them unbalanced with normal humans in the real world. Characters that can be taken out are those who receive approval and 'enough' popularity from their readers and viewers.

The main protagonist of the magical girl anime series . Being from a series aimed at children, she was initially very naive, quickly resorting to violence if others don't agree with her. However, she eventually realizes the hypocrisy in her actions. While initially a supporter of Altair, she turns against her after discovering her true motives. (She was the only creation whose creator was never revealed nor introduced in the series.) She is ultimately killed by Altair after a tense confrontation with her.

The main antagonist of the  action manga. He was once the best friend of the protagonist, Shō, until he supposedly killed their friend and Shō's sister. In reality, however, he was set up by the true culprit. Afterwards, he became a gang-boss in a lawless Adachi. He uses a bokken called "Kuronagimaru" that can produce gusts of air and can summon a spirit called an "Astral Double" named "Hangaku" to fight by his side. Upon arriving in the real world, he desires to fight strong opponents, which prompts him to join Sōta's group.

The protagonist of the fantasy epic manga and anime franchise . She is a princess and a knight who constantly fights a losing battle against the series' antagonists. She fights using a lance and uses magic through her "Gauntlet of Götz von Berlichingen". She also rides on a pegasus. Upon arriving in the real world, she gained an intense hatred of her creator, Gai, for making her world into such a dark setting for the sake of "entertainment" and suffered from a mild identity crisis upon learning that she is a creation. She desired to use the creators' power to save her world and fell into denial upon learning that this is impossible. She is aligned with Altair, due to her desire to change her world.

A secondary character from the cyberpunk anime and manga Code・Babylon. He is the partner of the protagonist and works for the "Flashlight Detective Office", which hunts monsters. He uses a gun and a watch that allows him to fly. He also possesses special bullets called "Gravity Bombs". Upon arriving in the real world, he sides with Altair because she resembles his deceased daughter, Erina, and to get revenge on his creator, Shunma, for killing her.

The main protagonist of the mecha anime  who protects the series' futuristic setting from the antagonists. While normally pretty energetic, he also gets whiny easily. He pilots the giant robot "Gigas Machina", which is equipped with a huge arsenal of futuristic weapons. After coming to the real world and learning that he's a creation, he isn't dismayed and even comes to take pride in it. He joins Sōta's group because they are the first faction he meets.

An antagonist from the light novel and anime series . While putting on the guise of an energetic high school student, she is really a psychotic murderer who killed her entire school. She possesses an ability called "Infinite Deception of Words" that allows her to bend reality through lies; Upon arriving in the real world, she joins neither Sōta's nor Altair's faction and causes trouble for both sides.

A heroine from the all-ages version of adult dating sim game . She is found by Selesia and Rui. As she has no fighting powers at all, her creator comes up with the idea of creating a fan disk to give her some. As a result, she fights using a Nunchaku and monstrous strength, and calls herself "Extreme Final Legend Martial Artist", even though she herself is embarrassed over it. She aligns herself with Sōta's group, and works to return to her world.

The main protagonist of the  action manga. He was once the best friend of the series' antagonist, Yūya, until the latter supposedly killed their friend and his sister. Afterwards, he was granted a spirit called an "Astral Double" named "Bayard" by a fortuneteller to take revenge on Yūya. He fights using a retractable three-section staff and can summon "Bayard" to fight by his side. "Bayard" can also attack using reflections. Upon arriving in the real world, he allies himself with Altair because she is Yūya's enemy.

A supporting character from the cyberpunk anime and manga Code・Babylon. She is Blitz' daughter. At some point in the story, she was abducted by an antagonist and fused to a portal that would unleash monsters into the world, forcing Blitz to kill her.

The main male protagonist of the  light novel series. He is a knight who, alongside his partner Selesia, fights against the series' antagonists. However, as the series progressed, his resolve wavered. He fights using a sword and pilots a darker version of "Vogelchevalier". Upon arriving in the real world and learning that he's a creation, he fell into despair and allied himself with Altair to use the creators' power to save his world.

Creators
 are people who created the Creations. They can be the scenario writer, character designer, planner, or the author of their respective series. They are able to 'upgrade' their respective characters if they receive enough positive responses from readers and viewers.

 

The creator of the online video called Altair: World Étude, from which Altair originated. She was originally an amateur manga artist, and upon being noticed by the community, became a more well known name. She befriends Sōta in middle school before her drawings get noticed, but they drift apart after she gains recognition.
 

Takashi is the original author of the light novel Elemental Symphony of Vogelchevalier. While he and Selesia initially clashed over his attitude towards her, he has developed a greater sense of respect for her, and began to care for her just like his own daughter.
 

Marine is the illustrator of the light novel Elemental Symphony of Vogelchevalier. She takes custody of Selesia and Meteora since Sōta couldn't continue to provide for them. She is actually rather insecure about her illustrations, believing them to be inferior to those of other great illustrators. However, she uses this insecurity as resolve to continue to improve her drawing skills.

The screenplay and scenario writer for the anime Infinite Divine Machine Mono Magia. He initially finds Rui when watching his anime. He later heads the writing along with Takashi for the government plan.
 

The chill author of manga series Code・Babylon who speaks in Kansai dialect. She's often mistaken as a man due to her pen name and art style. As a result of a history of having her stories rejected by her audience, she has grown very cynical towards the entertainment industry. This also causes her to be willing to go very far to make sure her stories remain interesting, even if it means killing off characters in horrible ways.
 

The author of manga series Lockout Ward Underground -Dark Night-. Despite his abrasive personality, he actually cares about other people, and is thus labeled a tsundere by Suruga.
 

The author of manga series Alicetaria of the Scarlet. He was locked away by Alicetaria out of her anger towards him (due to the fact that her cruel world is just entertainment) until Sōta expressed his feelings towards her story. After being released by Alicetaria, he joins the effort to defeat Altair.

The writer for The Milky Way of a Starry Sky, who belongs to the company Hyper Tension and is an old friend of Masaaki's. He's a huge otaku and a pervert who fell in love with his own creation.

The planner of Avalken of Reminisce, who died due to a car accident prior to the story, but his name was never mentioned in the series (Episode 4 only reveals his occupation and autopsy report, without stating his name).

Author of the light novel Record of the Night Window Demon, he was killed by Magane for unknown motive and reason.

The General Coordinator Officer for the Situations Countermeasures Council, who is in charge of responding to the characters appearing in the real world. After the events of the series, she resigns from her government job and becomes a Creator herself.

Media

Manga
A manga adaptation by Daiki Kase was announced on February 18, 2017 in the March 2017 issue of the Monthly Sunday Gene-X magazine published by Shogakukan. It was serialized in the magazine from April 19, 2017 to November 19, 2019.

Another manga adaptation by Yūki Kumagai, that served as a spin-off to the main anime series that focused on a different set of characters, titled , was serialized in Shogakukan's Monthly Shōnen Sunday from June 12 to November 10, 2017. Shogakukan released a compiled tankōbon volume on December 19, 2017.

A spin-off manga by Tatsuhiko Ida, titled , was serialized on Shogakukan's Sunday Webry website from August 6 to November 5, 2017. A collected tankōbon volume was released on December 19, 2017.

Volume list

Anime
The series' original concept is by Rei Hiroe and directed by Ei Aoki. Hiroe provided the original character designs, Ryuichi Makino provided the adapted character designs and Hiroyuki Sawano composed the music for the anime. Hiroe's original story for the anime was published on Shogakukan's Sunday Webry website, under the title Re:Creators Naked. The series aired in Japan from April 8 to September 16, 2017 on Tokyo MX and other television networks, and was simulcast exclusively on Amazon's Amazon Video service. The first opening theme is "gravityWall" by SawanoHiroyuki[nZk]:Tielle & Gemie, and the ending theme song is "NewLook" by Mashiro Ayano. Episode 13 features an ending song by Aki Toyosaki under her character name Altair titled "World Étude". The anime ran for 22 episodes with 3 special programs.

Specials:
 ENTER THE WORLD OF Re:CREATORS
 Re:CREATORS Summer Special Spending Time with the Girl Creations!
 Re:CREATORS Summer Special Continued It's Summer! It's Yukata! It's a Girls Party!

Soundtrack

The series' soundtrack was composed by Hiroyuki Sawano. The soundtrack album was released by Aniplex on June 14, 2017 with a total of 34 tracks split across two discs.

Notes

References

External links
 

2017 anime television series debuts
Action anime and manga
Animated television series about monsters
Animated television series about robots
Anime and manga about parallel universes
Anime and manga about revenge
Anime composed by Hiroyuki Sawano
Anime Strike
Anime with original screenplays
Aniplex
Fantasy anime and manga
Isekai anime and manga
Mass media franchises
Mecha anime and manga
Metafictional television series
Military anime and manga
Seinen manga
Shogakukan franchises
Shogakukan manga
Shōnen manga
Suicide in television
Television series about parallel universes
Television series set in the future
Television shows set in Tokyo
Tokyo MX original programming
Troyca